Ricardo Mello won the inaugural event, by defeating Thiago Alves 5–7, 6–4, 6–4 in the final.

Seeds

  Ricardo Mello (champion)
  Federico del Bonis (first round)
  David Guez (quarterfinals)
  Josselin Ouanna (first round)
  João Souza (first round)
  Thiago Alves (final)
  Uladzimir Ignatik (semifinals)
  Matthew Ebden (semifinals)

Draw

Finals

Top half

Bottom half

References
Main Draw
Qualifying Singles

Aberto de Bahia - Singles
Sport in Salvador, Bahia

it:Aberto de Brasília 2010 - Singolare